Oecobiidae, also called disc web spiders, is a family of araneomorph spiders, including about 100 described species. Larger ones tend to be desert-dwelling. The legs are unusually evenly placed around the prosoma; most other spiders have some legs directed clearly forward and the rest clearly backward, or all forward. The first two pairs of legs of many Oecobiids point forward then curve backwards; somehow in a running spider this gives a curiously scurrying, wheel-like impression that is characteristic of many Oecobiidae, and is helpful as a rough-and-ready aid to identification in the field. Characteristic of the family is the anal gland; it bears a tuft of long hairs. Typical colour patterns range from dark-patterned cream in some smaller species, to a small number of symmetrically-placed, conspicuous round light spots (commonly yellow or white) on a background that may be anything from a dull orange colour to black. The carapace is rounded and bears a compact group of six to eight eyes medially situated near the front of its dorsal surface.

Many Oecobiidae build small, temporary star-shaped webs on or under rocks, or on walls or gravel. They hide near or below such webs and prey largely on ants, giving rise to common names such as "anteater" or "miervreter" (Afrikaans for anteater). Some of the Oecobiidae build tiny webs close to the ceilings in people's homes, which might have something to do with the family name (Oeco biidae meaning in essence "those who are house-living").

The species Oecobius navus occurs around the world.

While the genus Oecobius is cribellate, the genus Uroctea is ecribellate.

Genera

, the World Spider Catalog accepts the following genera:

Oecobius Lucas, 1846 — Africa, Asia, Europe, North America, Brazil, Costa Rica, Oceania
Paroecobius Lamoral, 1981 — South Africa, Madagascar, Botswana
Platoecobius Chamberlin & Ivie, 1935 — United States, Argentina
Uroctea Dufour, 1820 — Asia, Africa
Urocteana Roewer, 1961 — Senegal
Uroecobius Kullmann & Zimmermann, 1976 — South Africa

Extinct genera 

 †Mizalia Koch and Berendt 1854 Baltic amber, Eocene
 †Zamilia Wunderlich 2008 Burmese amber, Myanmar, Cenomanian

See also
 List of Oecobiidae species

References

 Huber, B.A. (1994): Spermophore morphology reveals a new synapomorphy of Oecobius and Uroctea (Araneae, Oecobiidae). Journal of Arachnology 22: 73-74. PDF

External links

 Picture of Oecobius navus
 Pictures of Oecobius sp. and web
 

 
Araneomorphae families